Van Voorhis is a census-designated place and coal town in Fallowfield Township, Washington County, Pennsylvania, United States.  As of the 2010 census the population was 166 residents.

References

Census-designated places in Washington County, Pennsylvania
Coal towns in Pennsylvania
Census-designated places in Pennsylvania